Justin Jordan (born 1978) is an American comics writer. He is known for co-creating (with artist Tradd Moore) The Strange Talent of Luther Strode and its two sequels (published by Image Comics), and for writing 22 issues of Green Lantern: New Guardians (DC Comics).

His other work includes writing 6- to 9-issue "New 52" runs on Superboy, Deathstroke, and Team 7 (DC); relaunching and writing 10 issues of Shadowman (Valiant Comics); and co-creating series such as Deep State (Boom! Studios), Spread (Image), Dead Body Road (Image), Dark Gods (Avatar Press), and Savage Things (Vertigo), Breaklands (ComiXology), and Reaver (Image).

In 2012, he was nominated for the Harvey Award for Most Promising New Talent. He is one of the writers of the Eisner-nominated In the Dark: A Horror Anthology (IDW).

Jordan, Dan DiDio, and Kenneth Rocafort launched the Sideways series in 2018 as part of DC's "Dark Matter" line.

References

External links

American comics writers
American horror writers
Living people
DC Comics people
Shippensburg University of Pennsylvania alumni
Writers from Pennsylvania
1978 births